The 19th New York State Legislature, consisting of the New York State Senate and the New York State Assembly, met from January 6 to April 11, 1796, during the first year of John Jay's governorship, in New York City.

Background
Under the provisions of the New York Constitution of 1777, the State Senators were elected on general tickets in the senatorial districts, and were then divided into four classes. Six senators each drew lots for a term of 1, 2, 3 or 4 years and, beginning at the election in April 1778, every year six Senate seats came up for election to a four-year term. Assemblymen were elected countywide on general tickets to a one-year term, the whole assembly being renewed annually.

In March 1786, the Legislature enacted that future Legislatures meet on the first Tuesday of January of each year unless called earlier by the governor. No general meeting place was determined, leaving it to each Legislature to name the place where to reconvene, and if no place could be agreed upon, the Legislature should meet again where it adjourned.

On February 7, 1791, the Legislature had re-apportioned the Senate and Assembly districts, according to the figures of the 1790 United States Census.

Matthew Clarkson resigned, leaving a vacancy in the Southern District; and John Williams was elected to Congress, leaving a vacancy in the Eastern District.

At this time the politicians were divided into two opposing political parties: the Federalists and the Democratic-Republicans.

Elections
The State election was held from April 28 to 30, 1795. U.S. Chief Justice John Jay was elected Governor; and State Senator Stephen Van Rensselaer was elected Lieutenant Governor; both were Federalists.

Senators Samuel Jones, Joshua Sands (both Southern D.), Thomas Tillotson (Middle D.) and Philip Schuyler (Western D.) were re-elected. Abraham Schenck (Middle D.) and Ebenezer Russell (Eastern D.) were also elected to full terms in the Senate. Philip Livingston (Southern D.) and Ambrose Spencer (Eastern D.) were elected to fill the vacancies.

Sessions
The Legislature was to meet at Federal Hall in New York City on January 5, 1796, but assembled a quorum only the next day. Both Houses adjourned on April 11.

William North was re-elected Speaker with a vote of 29 against 18 for James Watson; both were Federalists.

On February 12, 1796, the Legislature divided the State into seven districts, in each of which an Assistant Attorney General was to be the principal prosecuting officer, instead of the Attorney General and his deputy who had prosecuted statewide. The Attorney General continued to prosecute personally in New York City; the original Assistant Attorneys General appointed were: Nathaniel Lawrence, Jacob Radcliff, Ambrose Spencer, Anthony I. Blanchard, Abraham Van Vechten, William Stuart and Thomas R. Gold.

On March 4, 1796, the Legislature re-apportioned the Senate and Assembly districts, based on the figures of the New York State Census of 1795. The number of State Senators was increased from 24 to 43; the number of assemblymen was increased from 70 to 108; the two-county Assembly districts were dismembered, and several new counties were created.

State Senate

Districts
The Southern District (8 seats) consisted of Kings, New York, Queens, Richmond, Suffolk and Westchester counties.
The Middle District (6 seats) consisted of Dutchess, Orange and Ulster counties.
The Eastern District (5 seats) consisted of Washington, Clinton, Columbia and Rensselaer counties.
The Western District (5 seats) consisted of Albany, Montgomery, Herkimer, Ontario, Otsego, Saratoga, Tioga, Onondaga and Schoharie counties.

Note: There are now 62 counties in the State of New York. The counties which are not mentioned in this list had not yet been established, or sufficiently organized, the area being included in one or more of the abovementioned counties.

Members
The asterisk (*) denotes members of the previous Legislature who continued in office as members of this Legislature.

Employees
Clerk: Abraham B. Bancker

State Assembly

Districts

Albany and Schoharie counties (7 seats)
Columbia County (6 seats)
Dutchess County (7 seats)
Herkimer and Onondaga counties (1 seat)
Kings County (1 seat)
Montgomery County) (4 seats)
The City and County of New York (7 seats)
Ontario County (1 seat)
Orange County (3 seats)
Otsego County (1 seat)
Queens County (3 seats)
Rensselaer County (5 seats)
Richmond County (1 seat)
Saratoga County (4 seats) 
Suffolk County (4 seats)
Tioga County (1 seat)
Ulster County (5 seats)
Washington and Clinton counties (4 seats)
Westchester County (5 seats)

Note: There are now 62 counties in the State of New York. The counties which are not mentioned in this list had not yet been established, or sufficiently organized, the area being included in one or more of the abovementioned counties.

Assemblymen
The asterisk (*) denotes members of the previous Legislature who continued as members of this Legislature.

Employees
Clerk: Oliver L. Ker
Sergeant-at-Arms: Robert Hunter
Doorkeeper: Richard Ten Eyck

Notes

Sources
The New York Civil List compiled by Franklin Benjamin Hough (Weed, Parsons and Co., 1858) [see pg. 108 for Senate districts; pg. 115f for senators; pg. 148f for Assembly districts; pg. 169f for assemblymen]
Election result Assembly, Dutchess Co. at project "A New Nation Votes", compiled by Phil Lampi, hosted by Tufts University Digital Library
Election result Assembly, New York Co. at project "A New Nation Votes"
Election result Assembly, Otsego Co. at project "A New Nation Votes"
Election result Assembly, Rensselaer Co. at project "A New Nation Votes"
Election result Assembly, Ulster Co. at project "A New Nation Votes"

1795 in New York (state)
1796 in New York (state)
019